The 2015 Antonio Savoldi–Marco Cò – Trofeo Dimmidisì was a professional tennis tournament played on clay courts. It was the fourteenth edition of the tournament which is part of the 2015 ATP Challenger Tour. It took place in Manerbio, Italy between 24 and 30 August 2015.

ATP entrants

Seeds

 1 Rankings are as of August 17, 2015.

Other entrants
The following players received wildcards into the singles main draw:
  Erik Crepaldi
  Federico Gaio
  Riccardo Sinicropi
  Lorenzo Sonego

The following players received entry as a special exempt into the singles main draw:
  Pere Riba

The following players received entry from the qualifying draw:
  Cristian Garín
  Lorenzo Giustino
  Frederico Ferreira Silva
  Grega Žemlja

Champions

Singles

 Andrey Kuznetsov def.  Daniel Muñoz de la Nava, 6–4, 3–6, 6–1

Doubles

 Flavio Cipolla /  Daniel Muñoz de la Nava def.  Gero Kretschmer /  Alexander Satschko, 7–6(7–5), 3–6, [11–9]

External links
Official Website
ITF Search
ATP official site

Antonio Savoldi-Marco Co - Trofeo Dimmidisi
Antonio Savoldi–Marco Cò – Trofeo Dimmidisì
2015 in Italian tennis